Ogi may refer to:

People
Adolf Ogi (born 1942), Swiss politician
, Japanese football player
, Japanese actress and politician
Darko Ostojić (born 1965), nicknamed Ogi, Bosnian musician and actor
, Japanese football player
Ogi Ogas (born 1970s), American writer
Ogi (singer), American singer and songwriter

Places
Ogi, Angul, Odisha, India
Ogi, Ōita, a former town in Oita, Japan
Ogi, Niigata, a town located in Sado Island, Niigata Prefecture, Japan
Ogi, Saga, a city in Saga, Japan

Other uses
Ogi (food), a fermented cereal pudding
OGI School of Science and Engineering, Hillsboro, Oregon, United States
Ogi (character), one of the main characters of Bobinogs
Orchestra Giovanile Italiana

See also
 Ōgi Station (disambiguation)

Japanese-language surnames